Social Democratic Alliance may refer to:

Social Democratic Alliance, a political party in Iceland
Social Democratic Alliance of Moldova, a defunct political party in Moldova
Social Democratic Alliance (UK), a defunct political party in the United Kingdom